Stoyan Rogachev (born 4 September 1924) was a Bulgarian equestrian. He competed in two events at the 1952 Summer Olympics.

References

External links
 

1924 births
Possibly living people
Bulgarian male equestrians
Olympic equestrians of Bulgaria
Equestrians at the 1952 Summer Olympics
Place of birth missing (living people)
20th-century Bulgarian people